Aaron Quinn Schlosser (born November 30, 1972) is a Canadian professional wrestler, better known by his ring name, Ruffy Silverstein. He wrestles on the independent circuit in Canada and the northern United States.

Professional wrestling career 
Schlosser trained under the Hart family in Calgary and debuted in 1998 as "Ruffy Silverstein", facing The Cuban Assassin in Red Deer, Alberta. His wrestling name was given to him by Stu because Aaron reminded him of a wrestler from Stu's day named Ralph "Ruffy" Silverstein. He wrestled for the Hart family-owned Stampede Wrestling promotion for a year and a half. He later joined the Windsor, Ontario-based Border City Wrestling promotion. Schlosser also spent time as the Canadian champion in the CIWA (Canadian Independent Wrestling Alliance). Also wrestled for PWE, GLCW, CWA, CPW, XWC, OPW, CWI, GCPW, Big Time wrestling, GCW, CWE, PWA, and many other independent wrestling promotions.

Silverstein was a member of Team Canada in Total Nonstop Action Wrestling between October 5, 2004 and November 7, 2004. He teamed with Bobby Roode and Eric Young on the October 8, 2004 episode of TNA Xplosion and the October 22, 2004 episode of TNA Impact!, losing on both occasions.

Silverstein has had several WWE dark matches. In 2004 he wrestled Scott Steiner on a Sunday night heat taping. He also wrestled a dark match against Carlito in 2004. Most notable was when he teamed with Johnny Devine (wrestling as "J.P. Parsons") on the August 18, 2005 episode of WWE SmackDown!, losing to Road Warrior Animal and Heidenreich in a squash match. In 2007 he wrestled in a dark match (teaming with Lance Malibu, in a losing effort), against The Highlanders.

Ruffy currently helps train at the Figure Four Wrestling Academy in Bradford, Ontario alongside longtime friend "Cold Blooded" Chris Garvin. Notable graduates from the school include Mike Hart (grandson of Stu Hart and son of Smith Hart), RJ City and Jodi D'Milo.

Championships and accomplishments 
Canadian Independent Wrestling Alliance
CIWA Heavyweight Championship (1 time)
Fighting Spirit Pro Wrestling / Neo Spirit Pro Wrestling
F/NSPW Tag Team Championship (3 times) – with Marco Malaquias
Great Lakes Championship Wrestling
GLCW Canadian Heavyweight Championship (1 time)
GLCW Tag Team Championship (1 time) – with Marco Malaquias
Pure Wrestling Association
PWA Pure Wrestling Championship (1 time)
Other titles
PWE Cruiserweight Championship (1 time)

References

External links 
 
 

1972 births
Canadian male professional wrestlers
Living people
Professional wrestlers from Toronto
Stampede Wrestling alumni